Thonny Anderson da Silva Carvalho (born 27 December 1997), known as Thonny Anderson, is a Brazilian professional footballer who plays as an attacking midfielder for Ferroviária, on loan from Red Bull Bragantino.

Club career
Born in São Paulo, Anderson joined the youth setup of São Paulo FC in 2007, but soon moved to Osasco Audax. Although he initially played as a defender at the latter club, he later became a midfielder and started training with the senior team at the age of 16. In 2015, he signed for the under-17 team of Cruzeiro. Two years later, he captained the under-20 team in their league winning 2017 Brasileiro under-20 campaign and scored three goals in 13 matches. In the same year, he also captained Cruzeiro's 2017 Supercopa do Brasil under-20 winning team.

On 9 January 2018, Anderson was loaned out to Grêmio for the upcoming season. Fifteen days later, he made his debut, coming on as a substitute for Pepê in a 3–2 defeat against Avenida, in Campeonato Gaúcho. On 18 February, he scored his first goal for the club in a 2–1 defeat against Veranópolis.

On 9 May 2019, Anderson joined Athletico Paranaense on loan for the remainder of the season.

Career statistics

Honours
Atlético Paranaense
J.League Cup / Copa Sudamericana Championship: 2019
Copa do Brasil: 2019

References

External links
Thonny Anderson profile at Grêmio website

1997 births
Living people
Association football midfielders
Footballers from São Paulo
Brazilian footballers
Campeonato Brasileiro Série A players
Cruzeiro Esporte Clube players
Grêmio Foot-Ball Porto Alegrense players
Club Athletico Paranaense players
Red Bull Bragantino players
Esporte Clube Bahia players
Coritiba Foot Ball Club players
Associação Ferroviária de Esportes players